Peggy Yvonne O'Neal  (born 19 April 1952) is an American-born Australian lawyer who, since October 2013, has served as the president of the Richmond Football Club in the Australian Football League (AFL). She is the first woman in AFL history to serve as a club president. The Australian Financial Review has named her in its list of "Top 100 Women of Influence". In 2019 she was appointed an Officer of the Order of Australia (AO) for distinguished service to Australian rules football, to superannuation and finance law, and to the advancement of women in leadership roles. She was appointed Chancellor of RMIT University in October 2021.

Early life and legal career
O'Neal was born and raised in the now-abandoned small mining community of Killarney, West Virginia. She comes from a family of coal miners, and was the first in her family to go to university, studying law at the University of Virginia. O'Neal moved to Australia in 1989, after falling in love with an Australian backpacker while on holiday in Greece. She settled in the suburb of Richmond, Victoria, where she was introduced to football by friends. O'Neal worked as a lawyer with Herbert Smith Freehills and later with Lander & Rogers, and served on the boards of MLC Limited and the Commonwealth Superannuation Corporation. She was also chairman of the Law Council of Australia's superannuation committee and served as a consultant to the Rudd Government's review of the superannuation system.

Football administrator
After moving to the suburb of Richmond, O'Neal became a fan of the club due to sheer proximity and later became financially supportive, acting as a player sponsor. In 2003 she worked on the establishment of a club supporters’ business networking group, the Tommy Hafey Club. In 2005, O'Neal was elected to the board of the Richmond Football Club. She chaired the board's risk and compliance committee and was a member of the governance committee, as well as being chair of the Tigers in Community Foundation. O'Neal was elected club president in October 2013, in place of the retiring Gary March. She defeated two other candidates, investment banker Maurice O'Shannassy and former International Cricket Council CEO Malcolm Speed, becoming the first woman elected president of any AFL club. As president, O'Neal oversaw Richmond's 2017 premiership win – the club's first since 1980 and Richmond’s 2019 and 2020 Grand final wins – as well as its successful bid for an AFL Women's team, set to enter the competition in 2020. Following a disappointing 2016 season, she had been subject to an unsuccessful board challenge.

See also

 List of VFL/AFL commissioners and club presidents

References

Richmond Football Club administrators
Living people
American emigrants to Australia
20th-century Australian lawyers
People from Raleigh County, West Virginia
Lawyers from Melbourne
University of Virginia School of Law alumni
Virginia Tech alumni
1952 births
Officers of the Order of Australia
21st-century Australian lawyers